Bristol is a town in Bristol County, Rhode Island, US as well as the historic county seat. It is a deep water seaport named after Bristol, England.

The population of Bristol was 22,493 at the 2020 census. Major industries include boat building and related marine industries, manufacturing, and tourism.  The town's school system is united with that of the neighboring town of Warren. Prominent communities include Portuguese-Americans, mostly Azoreans, and Italian-Americans.

History

Early colonization 

Before the Pilgrims arrived in 1620, the Pokanokets occupied much of Southern New England, including Plymouth. They had previously suffered from a series of plagues which killed off large segments of their population, and their leader, the Massasoit Osamequin, befriended the early settlers. King Philip's War was a conflict between the Plymouth settlers and the Pokanokets and allied tribes, and it began in the neighboring area of Swansea, Massachusetts. Metacomet made nearby Mount Hope (a corruption of the Pokanoket word Montaup) his base of operations; he died following an ambush by Captain Benjamin Church on August 12, 1676. "Massasoit's Seat" is a rocky ledge on the mountain which was a lookout site for enemy ships on Mount Hope Bay.

After the war concluded, four Boston merchants—Stephen Burton, Nathaniel Byfield, Nathaniel Oliver, and John Walley—purchased a tract of land known as "Mount Hope Neck and Poppasquash Neck" as part of the Plymouth Colony. Other settlers included John Gorham and Richard Smith. A variant of the Indian name Metacomet is now the name of a main road in Bristol: Metacom Avenue (RI Route 136). Bristol was a town of Massachusetts until the Crown transferred it to the Rhode Island Colony in 1747.

Slave trade and the DeWolf family 

The DeWolf family was among the earliest settlers of Bristol. Bristol and Rhode Island became a center of slave trading. James DeWolf, a leading slave trader, later became a United States Senator from Rhode Island. Beginning in 1769 and continuing until 1820 (over a decade after the slave trade was outlawed in the Atlantic), the DeWolf family trafficked people out of West Africa, enslaving them and bringing them to work on DeWolf-owned plantations, or selling them to be auctioned at ports in places such as Havana, Cuba and Charleston, South Carolina. In Cuba, sugar and molasses, harvested/created by enslaved Africans, was brought back to Rhode Island to DeWolf-owned distilleries. By the end of 1820, the DeWolf family had trafficked and enslaved over 10,000 African people. James DeWolf died as the second wealthiest person in the United States.

As it did in many northern towns and port cities, slavery built the wealth of Bristol, which processed various materials, such as cotton, created or harvested through the use of slave labor. Quakers from Rhode Island were involved early in the abolition movement, although abolition was a divisive issue among Quakers, resulting in the creation of new Quaker groups.

The history of the DeWolf family, as well as Bristol's and the northern United States' participation in slavery, are covered in the 2008 documentary Traces of the Trade: A Story from the Deep North, in the 2008 companion memoir Inheriting the Trade: A Northern Family Confronts Its Legacy as the Largest Slave-Trading Dynasty in U.S. History by Thomas Norman DeWolf, and the 2014 historical study James DeWolf and the Rhode Island Slave Trade by Cynthia Mestad Johnson.

American Revolution 

 
During the American Revolutionary War, the British Royal Navy bombarded Bristol twice. On October 7, 1775, a group of ships led by Captain Wallace and  sailed into town and demanded provisions. When refused, Wallace shelled the town, causing much damage. The attack was stopped when Lieutenant Governor William Bradford rowed out to Rose to negotiate a cease-fire, but then a second attack took place on May 25, 1778. This time, 500 British and Hessian troops marched through the main street (now called Hope Street (RI Route 114)) and burnt 30 barracks and houses, taking some prisoners to Newport.

Other history and current day 

Until 1854, Bristol was one of the five state capitals of Rhode Island.

Bristol is home to Roger Williams University, named for Rhode Island founder Roger Williams.

The southerly terminus of the East Bay Bike Path is located at Independence Park on Bristol Harbor. The bike path continues north to India Point Park in Providence, R.I., mostly constructed following an abandoned railroad right of way. Some of the best views of Narragansett Bay can be seen along this corridor. This path is a valued commodity to Bristol; it allows bikers, roller skaters, and walkers to enjoy the area. The construction of the East Bay Bike Path was highly contested by Bristol residents before construction because of the potential of crime, but it has become a welcome asset to the community and the anticipated crime was non-existent.

The Bristol-based boat company Herreshoff built five consecutive America's Cup Defenders between 1893 and 1920. The Colt Estate, now known as Colt State Park, was home to Samuel P. Colt, nephew of the man famous for the arms company, and founder of the United States Rubber Company, later called Uniroyal and the largest rubber company in the nation. Colt State Park lies on manicured gardens abutting the West Passage of Narragansett Bay, and is popular for its views of the waterfront and sunsets.

Bristol is the site of the National Historic Landmark Joseph Reynolds House built in 1700. The Marquis de Lafayette and his staff used the building as headquarters in 1778 during the Battle of Rhode Island.

Fourth of July parade

Bristol has the oldest continuously celebrated Independence Day festivities in the United States.  The first mention of a celebration comes from July 1777, when a British officer noted sounds coming from across Narragansett Bay:

The annual official and historic celebrations (Patriotic Exercises) were established in 1785 by Rev. Henry Wight of the First Congregational Church and veteran of the Revolutionary War, and later by Rev. Wight as the Parade, and continue today, organized by the Bristol Fourth of July Committee. The festivities officially start on June 14, Flag Day, beginning a period of outdoor concerts, soapbox car races and a firefighters' muster at Independence Park. The celebration climaxes on July 4 with the oldest annual parade in the United States, "The Military, Civic and Firemen's Parade", an event that draws over 200,000 people from Rhode Island and around the world. These elaborate celebrations give Bristol its nickname, "America's most patriotic town".

Bristol is represented in the parade with hometown groups like the Bristol Train of Artillery and the Bristol County Fifes and Drums.

Geography
According to the United States Census Bureau, the town has a total area of 20.6 square miles (53.4 km2), of which, 10.1 square miles (26.2 km2) of it is land and 10.5 square miles (27.2 km2) of it (50.99%) is water. Bristol's harbor is home to over 800 boat moorings in seven mooring fields.

Climate

Demographics

As of the 2010 census Bristol had a population of 22,954.  The ethnic and racial composition of the population was 94.9% non-Hispanic white, 0.8% Black, 0.1% Native American, 0.9% Asian, 0.4% some other race, 1.4% from two or more races and 2.0% Hispanic or Latino of any race.

As of the census of 2000, there were 22,469 people, 8,314 households, and 5,653 families residing in the town. The ethnic group makeup of the town was 97.14% White, 1.29% Hispanic or Latino (of any race), 0.67% Asian, 0.62% Black, 0.16% Native American, 0.04% Pacific Islander, 0.33% other ethnic group, and 1.03% from two or more races.

Government

In the Rhode Island Senate, Bristol is split into three senatorial districts, all Democratic:

 District 10: Walter S. Felag, Jr.
 District 11: James A. Seveney
 District 32: Cynthia Armour Coyne

At the federal level, Bristol is a part of Rhode Island's 1st congressional district and is currently represented by Democrat David N. Cicilline. In presidential elections, Bristol is a Democratic stronghold, as no Republican presidential nominee has won the town since prior to the 1988 election.

Points of interest and Registered Historic Places

 America's Cup Hall of Fame
 Blithewold Mansion, Gardens and Arboretum
 Bristol Art Museum
 Bristol County Courthouse (Rhode Island)
 Bristol County Jail
 Bristol Customshouse and Post Office
 Bristol Ferry Lighthouse
 Bristol Waterfront Historic District
 Coggeshall Farm Museum
 Colt State Park
 Juniper Hill Cemetery
 Herreshoff Marine Museum
 Linden Place, home of the DeWolfs, Colts
 Longfield (Charles Dana Gibson house)
 Mount Hope Bridge
 Mount Hope Farm
 Poppasquash Farms Historic District
 Joseph Reynolds House
 Roger Williams University
 Roger Williams University School of Law

Notable people 

 William Thomas "Billy" Andrade, golfer with the PGA Tour; born in Bristol
 Ethel Barrymore Colt, silent film and stage actress; member of the influential Barrymore family
 Benjamin Bourne, US congressman and federal judge; born in Bristol
 William Bradford (1729–1808), physician, lawyer, and President pro tempore of the US Senate; lived and died in Bristol
 Jonathan Russell Bullock, federal and Rhode Island Supreme Court judge; born in Bristol
 Ambrose Burnside, railroad executive, US senator, 30th governor of Rhode Island, and Union Army general; lived and died in Bristol
 Sean Callery, Emmy-winning composer, raised in Bristol
 Mary Cantwell, journalist, magazine editor, author and member of The New York Times editorial board; grew up in Bristol
 Mary H. Gray Clarke (born 1835), correspondent
 Samuel P. Colt, entrepreneur, child labor advocate, and Rhode Island state representative; lived in Bristol
Mark Anthony DeWolf (1726–1793) was the fourth child of Charles DeWolf, the only one who returned to America. He became the patriarch of the Bristol branch of the DeWolf family; he was a merchant and slave trader.
James DeWolf (1764–1837), son of Mark Anthony DeWolf. He was one of the richest men of his time, making the majority of his fortune in the slave trade.
 General George W. DeWolf (1778–1844), a grandson of Mark Anthony DeWolf. He was a slave trader and the original owner of Linden Place
 Jonathan DeFelice, president of Saint Anselm College; lived in Bristol
 Rebecca Donovan, novelist
 Nancy Dubuc, businesswoman
 Ramon Guiteras, surgeon and urologist, born and buried in Bristol
 Nathanael Herreshoff, naval architect and mechanical engineer, designed several undefeated America's Cup winners; born in Bristol 
 Gilbert C. Hoover, USN admiral involved in the nuclear bomb project
 Edward L. Leahy, US senator and federal judge; born in Bristol
 Ira Magaziner, senior adviser for policy development to the Clinton administration; Chairman of the Clinton Foundation Policy Board; lives in Bristol
 Pat McGee, musician (Pat McGee Band)
Alyssa Merkle-Deschenes, National Director of Biomedical Engineering at CREF/ Steward Healthcare, former New England Patriots cheerleader
 Anthony Quinn, actor (Zorba the Greek, Lawrence of Arabia, Viva Zapata!, Lust for Life); twice won the Academy Award for Best Supporting Actor (1952, 1956); lived in Bristol. He loved his home so much that he requested, and was given permission by the town, to be buried on his property
 Norman Rene, theater and film director; born in Bristol
 John Saffin, merchant and author (A Brief and Candid Answer to Samuel Sewall's The Selling of Joseph, 1700); lived in Bristol
 Chris Santos, executive chef and owner of the Stanton Social and Beauty & Essex, judge on Chopped (Food Network TV), born in Bristol

See also 
 DeWolf family, a prominent local family which made their fortune in the slave trade

References

Further reading

External links

 Official Town Website
 Destination Bristol—official tourism site

 
County seats in Rhode Island
King Philip's War
Populated coastal places in Rhode Island
Portuguese-American culture in Rhode Island
Providence metropolitan area
Towns in Rhode Island